Raymond Joseph Garby (16 January 1923 – 15 March 2009) was an Australian rules footballer who played with Carlton in the Victorian Football League (VFL).

Family
The son of Samuel George Garby (1887-1959), and Mary Elizabeth Garby (1912-2007), née Bailey, Raymond Joseph Garby was born on 16 January 1923.

He married Jean Foley (1924-2012) in 1947.

Death
He died on 15 March 2009.

Footnotes

References
 World War Two Nominal Roll: Gunner Raymond Joseph Garby (VX139430), National Archives of Australia.
 Kneebone, Harry, "Victoria's Last-Minute Victory: S.S. Loses Match but Wind Prestige", The (Adelaide) Advertiser, (Monday, 25 July 1949), p.9.
 Garby's 18 Goals, The Age, (Monday, 11 June 1951), p.10.
 De Bolfo, Anthony, "Vale Ray Garby", Blueseum, 17 March 2009.

External links
 
 
 Ray Garby at Blueseum
 Ray Garby, at Boyles Football Photos.

Carlton Football Club players
Carlton Football Club Premiership players
Australian rules footballers from Victoria (Australia)
1923 births
2009 deaths
One-time VFL/AFL Premiership players